NBA Live 2001 is the 2001 installment of the NBA Live video games series. The cover features Kevin Garnett as a member of the Minnesota Timberwolves and in Lithuanian copies of NBA Live 2001, it features Arvydas Sabonis. The game was developed by EA Canada and published by Electronic Arts under the EA Sports Label, the game was released on October 16, 2000, for the PlayStation, January 22, 2001, for the PlayStation 2 and February 7, 2001, for Windows. NBA Live 2001 is followed by NBA Live 2002. The PC version of the game for the second year included EA's "Face in the Game" feature that debuted in NBA Live 2000, allowing players to use custom facial photographs on created players. 

There is an extremely rare localized PC version for Lithuanian market. Famous Lithuanian player Arvydas Sabonis is on the cover and manual. The text on them is in Lithuanian language, the disc is ordinary.

Reception

The PlayStation and PC versions received "generally favorable reviews", while the PlayStation 2 version received "average" reviews, according to video game review aggregator Metacritic. Emmett Schkloven of Next Generation said of the PS version, "If you like the franchise, it's a mild improvement. If you're not crazy about videogame basketball, this will not be the game to convert you." Rob Smolka of the same magazine later said of the PS2 version, "It's good looking and plays well, but it isn't quite the leap it should (and arguably could) have been."

References

External links

2000 video games
Electronic Arts games
NBA Live
NuFX games
Windows games
PlayStation (console) games
PlayStation 2 games
Video games developed in Canada
Video games set in 2000
Video games set in 2001